Henke is a surname. Notable people with the surname include:

 Adolph Henke (1775–1843), German physician and pharmacologist known for his work in medical forensics
 Brad William Henke (1966–2022), American actor and football player
 Ed Henke (born 1927), former National Football League player
 Ernst Ludwig Theodor Henke (1804–1872), German historian
 Fritz Henke (1921–1999), World War II Waffen-SS soldier awarded the Knight's Cross of the Iron Cross 
 Heinrich Philipp Konrad Henke (1752–1809), German theologian; father of Ernst Henke
 Holger Henke (born 1960), political scientist and former Vice Chancellor for Academic Affairs & Provost at Wenzhou-Kean University (China)
 Jana Henke (born 1973), German former swimmer
 Jonathan Henke (born 1974), American political blogger
 Karl Henke (1896–1945), World War II German general
 Kevin Henke, American geochemist
 Michael Henke (born 1957), German football coach and former player
 Nolan Henke (born 1964), American golfer
 Rudolf Henke (born 1954), German politician
 Thaddäus Haenke (1761–1816), Bohemian geographer and explorer in South America
 Tom Henke (born 1957), retired Major League Baseball relief pitcher
 Wayne J. Henke (born 1941), member of the Missouri House of Representatives
 Werner Henke (1909–1944), World War II German submarine commander

Fictional characters:
 Michelle Henke, in David Weber's Honorverse science fiction book series
 Skezz Henke, in the HBO television drama Oz

See also
 Hencke
 Hanke
 Henkes
 Henrik

Surnames from given names